Richard Cash may refer to:
 Richard Cash (politician), member of the South Carolina Senate
 Richard A. Cash, American global health researcher
 Rick Cash, American football defensive lineman